Thomas Ferns (born 22 November 1928) was a Scottish footballer who played for Dumbarton.

References

1928 births
Possibly living people
Scottish footballers
Dumbarton F.C. players
Scottish Football League players
Association football midfielders